Cream were  a British rock band formed in London in 1966. The group consisted of bassist Jack Bruce, guitarist Eric Clapton, and drummer Ginger Baker. Bruce was the primary songwriter and vocalist, although Clapton and Baker contributed to songs. Formed by members of previously successful bands, they are widely regarded as the first supergroup. Cream were highly regarded for the instrumental proficiency of each of their members. 

During their brief three-year career, the band released four albums, Fresh Cream (1966), Disraeli Gears (1967), Wheels of Fire (1968), and Goodbye (1969). Beginning with Disraeli Gears, the band was joined in the studio by producer and multi-instrumentalist Felix Pappalardi, who became an important influence on the band's sound. Cream's music spanned many genres of rock music, including blues rock ("Crossroads", "Born Under a Bad Sign"), psychedelic rock ("Tales of Brave Ulysses", "White Room"), and hard rock ("Sunshine of Your Love", "SWLABR"). Throughout their career, they sold more than 15 million records worldwide. The group's third album, Wheels of Fire (1968), is the first platinum-selling double album.    

Tensions between Bruce and Baker led to their decision in May 1968 to break up, though the band were persuaded to make a final album, Goodbye, and to tour, culminating in two final farewell concerts at the Royal Albert Hall on 25 and 26 November 1968 which were filmed and shown in theatres, then in 1977 released as a home video, Farewell Concert.

In 1993, Cream were inducted into the Rock and Roll Hall of Fame. They were included in both Rolling Stone and VH1's lists of the "100 Greatest Artists of All Time", at number 67 and 61 respectively. They were also ranked number 16 on VH1's "100 Greatest Artists of Hard Rock".

History

Formation (1966)
By July 1966, Eric Clapton's career with the Yardbirds and John Mayall & the Bluesbreakers had earned him a reputation as the premier blues guitarist in Britain. Clapton, however, found the environment of Mayall's band confining, and sought to expand his playing in a new band. In 1966, Clapton met Ginger Baker, then the drummer of the Graham Bond Organisation, for which Jack Bruce had played bass guitar, harmonica and piano. Baker felt stifled in the Graham Bond Organisation and had grown tired of Graham Bond's drug addictions and bouts of mental instability. "I had always liked Ginger", explained Clapton. "Ginger had come to see me play with the Bluesbreakers. After the gig he drove me back to London in his Rover. I was very impressed with his car and driving. He was telling me that he wanted to start a band, and I had been thinking about it too."

Each was impressed with the other's playing abilities, prompting Baker to ask Clapton to join his new, then-unnamed group. Clapton immediately agreed, on the condition that Baker hire Bruce as the group's bassist; according to Clapton, Baker was so surprised at the suggestion that he almost crashed the car. Clapton had met Bruce when the bassist/vocalist briefly played with the Bluesbreakers in November 1965; the two also had recorded together as part of an ad hoc group dubbed Powerhouse (which also included Steve Winwood and Paul Jones). Impressed with Bruce's vocals and technical prowess, Clapton wanted to work with him on an ongoing basis.

In contrast, while Bruce was in Bond's band, he and Baker had been notorious for their quarrelling. Their volatile relationship included on-stage fights and the sabotage of one another's instruments. After Baker fired Bruce from the band, Bruce continued to arrive for gigs; ultimately, Bruce was driven away from the band after Baker threatened him at knifepoint.

Baker and Bruce tried to put aside their differences for the good of Baker's new trio, which he envisioned as collaborative, with each of the members contributing to music and lyrics. The band was named "Cream", as Clapton, Bruce, and Baker were already considered the "cream of the crop" amongst blues and jazz musicians in the exploding British music scene. Initially, the group were referred to and billed as "The Cream", but starting officially with its first record releases, the trio came to be known as "Cream". Despite this, the band was referred to as "The Cream" on several occasions by promoters and disc jockeys, and even on occasion by the band members themselves. Before deciding upon "Cream", the band considered calling themselves "Sweet 'n' Sour Rock 'n' Roll". Of the trio, Clapton had the biggest reputation in England; however, he was unknown in the US, having left the Yardbirds before "For Your Love" hit the American Top Ten.

The band made its unofficial debut at the Twisted Wheel on 29 July 1966. Its official debut came two nights later at the Sixth Annual Windsor Jazz & Blues Festival. Being new and with few original songs to its credit, they performed blues reworkings that thrilled the large crowd and earned it a warm reception. In October the band also got a chance to jam with Jimi Hendrix, who had recently arrived in London. Hendrix was a fan of Clapton's music, and wanted a chance to play with him onstage.

It was during the early organisation that they decided Bruce would serve as the group's lead vocalist. While Clapton was shy about singing, he occasionally harmonised with Bruce and, in time, took lead vocals on several Cream tracks including "Four Until Late", "Strange Brew", "World of Pain", "Outside Woman Blues", "Crossroads", and "Badge".

Fresh Cream (1966)

The band's debut album, Fresh Cream, was recorded and released in 1966. The album reached number 6 in the UK charts and number 39 in the US. It was evenly split between self-penned originals and blues covers, including "Four Until Late", "Rollin' and Tumblin'", "Spoonful", "I'm So Glad" and "Cat's Squirrel". The rest of the songs were written by either Jack Bruce or Ginger Baker. ("I Feel Free", a UK hit single, was included on only the American edition of the LP.) The track "Toad" contained one of the earliest examples of a drum solo in rock music as Ginger Baker expanded upon his early composition "Camels and Elephants", written in 1965 with the Graham Bond Organisation.

Early Cream bootlegs display a much tighter band showcasing more songs. All of the songs are reasonably short, including five-minute versions of "N.S.U.", "Sweet Wine" and "Toad". But a mere two months later, the setlist shortened, with the songs then much longer.

Disraeli Gears (1967)

The band first visited the US in March 1967 to play nine dates at the RKO 58th Street Theatre in New York City. There was little impact, as impresario Murray the K placed them at the bottom of a six-act bill that performed three times per date, eventually reducing the band to one song per concert. They returned to record Disraeli Gears in New York between 11 and 15 May 1967. This, the band's second album, was released in November 1967 and reached the top five in the charts on both sides of the Atlantic. Produced by Felix Pappalardi (who later co-founded the Cream-influenced quartet Mountain) and engineer Tom Dowd, it was recorded at Atlantic Studios in New York. Disraeli Gears is often considered to be the band's defining effort, successfully blending psychedelic British rock with American blues.

Disraeli Gears also included "Sunshine of Your Love", which became the group's unofficial anthem, and is probably their best-known song today. Bruce and Pete Brown came upon the idea in a state of near desperation in the wee hours. In a last-ditch attempt to salvage something from the long and fruitless night at his apartment, the bleary-eyed Bruce pulled out his double bass again and played a riff. At that point, Brown looked out the window and saw the sun was about to rise: "It's getting near dawn", he said to himself. Brown put the words on paper then thought some more: "When lights close their tired eyes".

The album was originally slated for release in the summer of 1967, but the record label opted to scrap the planned cover and repackage it with a new psychedelic cover, designed by artist Martin Sharp, and the resulting changes delayed its release for several months. The cover was remarkable for the time, with a psychedelic design patterned over a publicity photo of the trio.

Although the album is considered one of Cream's finest efforts, it has never been well represented in the band's live sets. Although they consistently played "Tales of Brave Ulysses" and "Sunshine of Your Love", several songs from Disraeli Gears were quickly dropped from performances in mid-1967, favouring longer jams instead of short pop songs. "We're Going Wrong" was the only additional song from the album the group performed live. In fact, at their 2005 reunion shows in London, the band played only three songs from Disraeli Gears: "Outside Woman Blues", "We're Going Wrong", and "Sunshine of Your Love"; at their three October 2005 performances in New York, "Tales of Brave Ulysses" was also included in the setlist.

In August 1967, the band played their first headlining dates in the US, first at The Fillmore in San Francisco and later at The Pinnacle in Los Angeles. The concerts were a great success and proved very influential on both the band itself and the flourishing hippie scene surrounding them. Upon discovering a growing listening audience, the band began to stretch out on stage, incorporating more time in their repertoire, some songs reaching jams of twenty minutes. Long, drawn-out jams in numbers like "Spoonful", "N.S.U.", "I'm So Glad", and "Sweet Wine" became live favourites, while songs like "Sunshine of Your Love", "Crossroads", and "Tales of Brave Ulysses" remained reasonably short.

Wheels of Fire (1968)

In 1968 came the band's third release, Wheels of Fire, which topped the American charts. The album was recorded in a spate of short sessions from July 1967 to June 1968. Still a relative novelty, the double album of two LP records was well-suited to extended solos. The Wheels of Fire studio recordings showcased the band moving away from the blues and more towards a semi-progressive rock style highlighted by odd time signatures and various orchestral instruments. However, the band did record Howlin' Wolf's "Sitting on Top of the World" and Albert King's "Born Under a Bad Sign". According to a BBC interview with Clapton, the record company, Atco Records, also handling Albert King, asked the band to cover "Born Under a Bad Sign", which became a popular track off the record. The opening song, "White Room", became a radio staple. Another song, "Politician", was written by the band while waiting to perform live at the BBC. The album's second disc included three live recordings from the Winterland Ballroom and one from the Fillmore. Clapton's second solo from "Crossroads" has made it to the top 20 in multiple "greatest guitar solo" lists.

After the completion of Wheels of Fire in mid-1968, the band members had grown tired of their exhausting touring schedule and increasingly loud jamming, and wanted to go their separate ways. Baker stated in a 2006 interview with Music Mart magazine, "It just got to the point where Eric said to me: 'I've had enough of this', and I said so have I. I couldn't stand it. The last year with Cream was just agony. It damaged my hearing permanently, and today I've still got a hearing problem because of the sheer volume throughout the last year of Cream. But it didn't start off like that. In 1966, it was great. It was really a wonderful experience musically, and it just went into the realms of stupidity." Bruce and Baker's combustible relationship proved even worse as a result of the strain put upon the band by non-stop touring, forcing Clapton to play the perpetual role of peacekeeper.

Clapton had also become interested in the music of Bob Dylan's former backing group, now known as the Band, and their debut album, Music from Big Pink, which proved to be a welcome breath of fresh air to Clapton in comparison to the psychedelia and volume that had defined Cream. Furthermore, he had read a scathing Cream review in Rolling Stone, a publication he had much admired, in which the reviewer, Jon Landau, called him a "master of the blues cliché". In the wake of that article, Clapton wanted to end Cream and pursue a different musical direction.

At the beginning of the band's farewell tour on 4 October 1968, in Oakland, California, nearly the entire set consisted of songs from Wheels of Fire: "White Room", "Politician", "Crossroads", "Spoonful", and "Deserted Cities of the Heart", with "Passing the Time" taking the place of "Toad" for a drum solo. "Passing the Time" and "Deserted Cities" were quickly removed from the setlist and replaced by "Sitting on Top of the World" and "Toad".

Goodbye and break-up (1968–1969)

From its creation, Cream was faced with some fundamental problems that would later lead to its dissolution in November 1968. The antagonism between Bruce and Baker created tensions in the band. Clapton also felt that the members of the band did not listen to each other enough. Equipment during these years had also improved; new Marshall amplifier stacks produced more power, and Jack Bruce pushed the volume levels higher, creating tension for Baker, who would have trouble competing with roaring stacks. Clapton spoke of a concert during which he stopped playing and neither Baker nor Bruce noticed. Clapton has also commented that Cream's later gigs mainly consisted of its members showing off.

Cream decided that they would break up in May 1968 during a tour of the US. Later, in July, the band announced that they would break up after a farewell tour of the US and after playing two concerts in London. Jack Bruce was quoted as saying "Travel can kill a group. It becomes boring, tiring and very depressing." 

Cream were eventually persuaded to do one final album, appropriately titled Goodbye. The album was recorded in late 1968 and released in early 1969, after the band had broken up. It comprised six songs: three live recordings dating from a concert at The Forum in Los Angeles, California, on 19 October, and three new studio recordings (including "Badge", which was written by Clapton and George Harrison, who also played rhythm guitar and was credited as "L'Angelo Misterioso"). "I'm So Glad" was included among the live tracks. 

Cream's farewell tour consisted of 22 shows at 19 venues in the US from 4 October to 4 November 1968, and two final farewell concerts at the Royal Albert Hall on 25 and 26 November 1968. The final US gig was at the Rhode Island Auditorium on 4 November. The band arrived late and, due to local restrictions, were able to perform only two songs, "Toad" and a 20+ minute version of "Spoonful". The two Royal Albert Hall concerts were filmed for a BBC documentary and released on video (and later DVD) as Farewell Concert. Both shows were sold out and attracted more attention than any other Cream concert, but their performance was regarded by many as below standard. Baker himself said of the concerts: "It wasn't a good gig ... Cream was better than that ... We knew it was all over. We knew we were just finishing it off, getting it over with." Bruce had three Marshall stacks on stage for the farewell shows but one acted only as a spare, and he only used one or two, depending on the song. In an interview from Cream: Classic Artists, he added that the band was getting worse by the minute.

Post-Cream

Blind Faith, a band that included both Clapton and Baker, was formed after the demise of Cream, following an attempt by Clapton to recruit Steve Winwood into Cream in the hope that he would help act as a buffer between Bruce and Baker. Inspired by more song-based acts, Clapton went on to perform very  different, less improvisational material with Delaney & Bonnie, Derek and the Dominos, and in his own long and varied solo career.

Bruce began a varied and successful solo career with the 1969 release of Songs for a Tailor, while Baker formed a jazz-fusion ensemble out of the ashes of Blind Faith called Ginger Baker's Air Force, with Winwood, Blind Faith bassist Rick Grech, Graham Bond on saxophone, and guitarist Denny Laine of the Moody Blues and (later) Wings.

All three members continued to explore new musical ideas and partnerships, play concerts and record music for over four decades after ending Cream.

Reunions

Rock and Roll Hall of Fame
In 1993, Cream were inducted into the Rock and Roll Hall of Fame and re-formed to perform at the induction ceremony. Initially, the trio were wary about performing, until encouraging words from Robbie Robertson inspired them to try.  The set consisted of "Sunshine of Your Love", "Crossroads", and "Born Under a Bad Sign", a song they had not previously played live. Clapton mentioned in his acceptance speech that their rehearsal the day before the ceremony had marked the first time they had played together in 25 years. This performance spurred rumours of a reunion tour. Bruce and Baker said in later interviews that they were, indeed, interested in touring as Cream. A formal reunion did not take place immediately, as Clapton, Bruce and Baker continued to pursue solo projects, although the latter two worked together again in the mid-1990s as two-thirds of the power trio BBM with Irish blues rock guitarist Gary Moore.

2005 concerts
At Clapton's request, Cream reunited for a series of four shows, on 2, 3, 5, and 6 May 2005 at the Royal Albert Hall in London, the venue of their final concerts in 1968. Although the three musicians chose not to speak publicly about the shows, Clapton would later state that he had become more "generous" in regard to his past, and that the physical health of Bruce and Baker was a major factor: Bruce had recently undergone a transplant for liver cancer in 2003, and had almost lost his life, while Baker had severe arthritis.

Tickets for all four shows sold out in under an hour. The performances were recorded for a live CD and DVD. Among those in attendance were Bill Wyman, Steve Winwood, Paul McCartney, Ringo Starr, Roger Waters, Brian May, Jimmy Page, and Mick Taylor. The reunion marked the first time the band had played "Badge" and "Pressed Rat and Warthog" live.

Inspired by the success of the reunion, the band agreed to an additional set of three shows at the Madison Square Garden in New York City, from 24–26 October 2005. According to Clapton, these concerts did not live up to the Royal Albert Hall performances due to, among other reasons, lack of rehearsal and the resurgence of old grudges among band members.

Post-2005
In February 2006, Cream received a Grammy Lifetime Achievement Award in recognition of their contribution to, and influence upon, modern music. That same month, a "Classic Albums" DVD was released detailing the story behind the creation and recording of Disraeli Gears. On the day prior to the Grammy ceremony, Bruce made a public statement that more one-off performances of Cream had been planned: multiple dates in a few cities, similar to the Royal Albert Hall and Madison Square Garden shows. 

However, this story was denied by both Clapton and Baker, first by Clapton in The Times in April 2006. When asked about Cream, Clapton said: "No. Not for me. We did it and it was fun. But life is too short. I've got lots of other things I would rather do, including staying at home with my kids. The thing about that band was that it was all to do with its limits ... it was an experiment." In an interview in the UK magazine Music Mart, about the release of a DVD about the Blind Faith concert in Hyde Park 1969, Baker commented about his unwillingness to continue the Cream reunion. These comments were far more specific and explosive than Clapton's, as they were centred around his relationship with Jack Bruce. Ginger said, "When he's Dr. Jekyll, he's fine ... It's when he's Mr. Hyde that he's not. And I'm afraid he's still the same. I tell you this – there won't ever be any more Cream gigs, because he did Mr. Hyde in New York last year."

When asked to elaborate, Baker replied:

Baker and Bruce appeared on stage in London when Baker was awarded a lifetime achievement award by legendary cymbal manufacturer Zildjian. Bruce told Detroit's WCSX radio station in May 2007 that there were plans for a Cream reunion later in the year. It was later revealed that the potential performance was to be November 2007 in London as a tribute to Ahmet Ertegun. The band decided against it and this was confirmed by Bruce in a letter to the editor of the Jack Bruce fanzine, The Cuicoland Express, dated 26 September 2007:

The headlining act for the O2 Arena Ahmet Ertegun Tribute Concert (postponed to December 2007) turned out to be from another reunited English hard-rock act, Led Zeppelin. In an interview with BBC 6 Music in April 2010, Bruce confirmed that there would be no more Cream shows, stating simply, "Cream is over."  Bruce died on 25 October 2014 and Baker died on 6 October 2019, leaving Clapton as the last surviving member.

Personnel

Band members
 Ginger Baker – drums, percussion, backing and lead vocals
 Jack Bruce – lead and backing vocals, bass guitar, keyboards, piano, harmonica, cello, acoustic guitar, recorder
 Eric Clapton – lead and rhythm guitars, backing and lead vocals

Session contributors

 Pete Brown – lyrics (1966–1969)
 Felix Pappalardi – production, viola, bells, organ, trumpet, tonette, mellotron, bass (1967–1969)
 George Harrison – rhythm guitar, backing vocals (1969)

Discography

 Fresh Cream (1966)
 Disraeli Gears (1967)
 Wheels of Fire (1968)
 Goodbye (1969)

See also 
 Album era

References

External links

 Ginger Baker's official website
 Jack Bruce's official website
 Eric Clapton's official website

 
Acid rock music groups
1966 establishments in England
1968 disestablishments in England
British musical trios
British supergroups
Rock music supergroups
Musical groups from London
English blues rock musical groups
English hard rock musical groups
British rhythm and blues boom musicians
English psychedelic rock music groups
Musical groups established in 1966
Musical groups disestablished in 1968
Grammy Lifetime Achievement Award winners
Polydor Records artists
Atco Records artists
RSO Records artists
Reprise Records artists
Eric Clapton